The GAZon NEXT is a truck produced by the Russian vehicle manufacturer GAZ. The vehicle has been in production since 2014 and is the successor to the GAZ-3307. Under the name Sadko NEXT comes a variant of the vehicle with four-wheel drive; accordingly, this is the successor to the GAZ-3308.

Overview 
The GAZon NEXT is a light two-axle truck with rear axle drive and 8.7 tonnes gross vehicle weight. It is offered with different body variants. Flatbed models are also delivered, as well as refrigerated vehicles or special vehicles for authorities or for snow removal. Likewise, garbage trucks are also being built.

The serial production of the GAZon NEXT commenced in Nizhny Novgorod on 19 September 2014 and the investment cost for the new production line amounted to more than 2.3 billion rubles. It is unclear in this context whether the production of the predecessor GAZ-3307 was discontinued at the same time, but this vehicle is no longer offered.

At the end of 2015, a basic GAZon NEXT cost about 1.4 million rubles (about €20,000 at that time).

Variants
According to GAZ, the GAZon NEXT is available in over 300 model variants. The following list is limited to the most important basic variants.
GAZ-С41R13-10 – standard model with a single cab and a short wheelbase of 
GAZ-С41R33-10 – standard model with a single cab and a long wheelbase of 
GAZ-ГАЗ-С41R33-10 – Version designated GAZon NEXT City. The entire vehicle is lower and has a deeper loading sill.
GAZ-С41R33-10 – GAZon NEXT City with a long wheelbase of 
GAZ-С42R33-10 – standard model with a long wheelbase and a crew cab
GAZ-С41R33-1010 – standard model with a tarpaulin, long wheelbase
GAZ-С41R13-1010 – standard model, but with a refrigerated body, short wheelbase

References

Pickup trucks
GAZ Group trucks